Unexploded Cow is a card game by Cheapass Games in which the objective is to blow up unexploded bombs in France with mad cows from Britain, earning money in the process. The winner is the person who collects the most money.

References

External links
Unexploded Cow product page at Cheapass Games

Card games introduced in 2001
Dedicated deck card games
Cheapass Games games